The Final Battle is a military science fiction novel by William C. Dietz, first published by Ace Books in 1995. This is the second book in the 9 book legion series by Dietz.

The Confederacy is threatened by an uprising of the Hudathans, an unfeeling reptilian race that has built up its forces through stolen technology and millennia of civil war, and their only opponents are the members of the Legion.

1995 American novels
1995 science fiction novels
Ace Books books
American science fiction novels
Military science fiction novels